The SKI protein is a nuclear proto-oncogene that is associated with tumors at high cellular concentrations.  SKI has been shown to interfere with normal cellular functioning by both directly impeding expression of certain genes inside the nucleus of the cell as well as disrupting signaling proteins that activate genes.

SKI negatively regulates transforming growth factor-beta (TGF-beta) by directly interacting with Smads and repressing the transcription of TGF-beta responsive genes.  This has been associated with cancer due to the large number of roles that peptide growth factors, of which TGF-beta are a subfamily, play in regulating cellular functions such as cell proliferation, apoptosis, specification, and developmental fate.

The name SKI comes from the Sloan-Kettering Institute where the protein was initially discovered.

Structure

Gene 

The SKI proto-oncogene is located at a region close to the p73 tumor suppressor gene at the locus 1p36.3 locus of a gene, suggesting a similar function to the p73 gene.

Protein 

The SKI protein has a 728 amino acid sequence, with multiple domains. It is expressed both inside and outside of the nucleus.  It is in the same family as the SnoN protein.  The different domains have different functions, with the primary domains interacting with Smad proteins.  The protein has a helix-turn-helix motif, a cysteine and histidine rich area which gives rise to the zinc finger motif, a basic amino acid region, and leucine zipper.  All these domains, including a proline rich region, are consistent with the fact that the protein must have domains that allow it to interact with other proteins.    The protein also has hydrophobic regions which come into contact with Smad proteins rich in leucine and phenylalanine amino acid regions.  Recent studies have suggested a domain similar to the Dachshund protein.  The SKI-Dachshund homology domain (SKI-DHD) contains the helix turn helix domains of the protein and the beta-alpha-beta turn motifs.

Function 

The SKI oncogene is present in all cells, and is commonly active during development.  Specifically, avian fibroblasts depend on the SKI protein as a transcription co-regulator inducing transformation. The aforementioned DHD region is specifically employed for protein-protein interactions, while the 191 amino acid C terminus mediates oligomerization.  Recent research shows that the SKI protein in cancerous cells acts as a suppressor, inhibiting transforming growth factor β (TGF- β) signaling.  TGF- β is a protein which regulates cell growth.  Signaling is regulated by a family of proteins called the Smad proteins.  SKI is present in all adult and embryonic cells at low levels, however an over expression of the protein is characteristic of tumor cells.   It is thought that high levels of SKI protein inactivate tumor suppression by displacement of other proteins and interference with the signaling pathway of TGF- β.  The SKI protein and the CPB protein compete for binding with the Smad proteins, specifically competing with the Smad-3 and CReB-binding protein interactions.  SKI also directly interacts with the R-Smad ∙ Smad-4 complex, which directly represses normal transcription of the TGF-β responsive genes, inactivating the cell's ability to stop growth and division, creating cancerous cells.

SKI has been linked to various cancers including human melanomas, esophageal squamous cell carcinoma, cervical cancer and the process of tumor progression.  The link of SKI with human melanoma has been the most studied area of the protein's link to cancer.  Currently it is thought that the SKI protein prevents response to TFG- β levels, causing tumor formation.

Related research 

Other research has identified proteins similar to Ski.  The SnoN protein was identified as a similar protein and is often discussed in conjugation with the Ski protein in publications.  Recent research suggests that the role of SnoN could be somewhat different, and could potentially even play an antagonistic role.

Other recent studies have determined Fussel-15 and Fussel-18 to be homologous to the Ski/Sno family of proteins.  Fussel-15 has been found to play much the same role as the Ski/Sno proteins, however its expression is not as ubiquitous as the Ski/Sno proteins.  Fussel-18 has been found to have an inhibitory role in the TGF-beta signaling.

Dachshund and SKIDA1 are also in the Ski/Sno/Dac family (.

Interactions 

SKI protein has been shown to interact with:
 HIPK2, 
 MECP2, 
 Mothers against decapentaplegic homolog 1 and 
 Mothers against decapentaplegic homolog 2,
 Mothers against decapentaplegic homolog 3, 
 NFIX, 
 Promyelocytic leukemia protein, 
 SKIL,  and
 SNW1.

References

Further reading 

 
 
 
 
 
 
 
 
 
 
 
 
 
 
 
 
 
 
 
 

Oncogenes